The Open International de Saint-Raphaël was a tournament for professional female tennis players. The event was classified as a $50,000+H ITF Women's Circuit tournament and was held in Saint-Raphaël, France, on indoor hardcourts from 1991 to 2010.

Past finals

Singles

Doubles

External links
 ITF search
 Official website

ITF Women's World Tennis Tour
Hard court tennis tournaments
Tennis tournaments in France
Recurring sporting events established in 1991
Recurring sporting events disestablished in 2010
Defunct tennis tournaments in France